The Stranger is an American silent film directed by Sidney Olcott with Gene Gauntier and Robert Vignola in the leading roles, and produced by Kalem Company.

Cast
 Gene Gauntier - 
 Robert Vignola -

Bibliography 

 The Bioscope, 1911, February 9. 
 The Film Index, 1910, December 24, p 21; December 31, p 5, p 22. 
 The Moving Picture World, vol 7, p 1547; vol 8, n°1, p 88. 
 The New York Dramatic Mirror, 1911, January 4, p 30.

External links 

The Stranger website dedicated to Sidney Olcott 

1910 films
Silent American drama films
American silent short films
Films directed by Sidney Olcott
1910 short films
1910 drama films
American black-and-white films
1910s American films